Saymon de Barros Cabral (born 9 July 2001) is a Brazilian footballer who plays as a winger for Emirati club Khor Fakkan, on loan from Avaí.

Club career

Spartak Trnava
Cabral joined Spartak Trnava in September 2019, initially starting in youth team and reserves. He made his first-team Fortuna Liga debut against Žilina on 14 June 2020.

References

External links
 FC Spartak Trnava official club profile
 Futbalnet profile 
 
 

2001 births
Living people
Brazilian footballers
Brazilian expatriate footballers
Association football forwards
Avaí FC players
FC Spartak Trnava players
Khor Fakkan Sports Club players
Slovak Super Liga players
UAE Pro League players
Brazilian expatriate sportspeople in Slovakia
Brazilian expatriate sportspeople in the United Arab Emirates
Expatriate footballers in Slovakia
Expatriate footballers in the United Arab Emirates